Bal Krishna Singh (18 April 1916 – 1977) was an Indian politician. He was elected to the Lok Sabha, lower house of the Parliament of India from Chandauli, Uttar Pradesh in 1962 as a member of the Indian National Congress.

Singh died in 1977.

References

External links
 Official biographical sketch in Parliament of India website

1916 births
1977 deaths
India MPs 1962–1967
Indian National Congress politicians
Lok Sabha members from Uttar Pradesh
People from Chandauli district